KIVE-LP (92.5 FM) is a radio station licensed to Aurora, Nebraska, United States. The station is an affiliate of Radio 74 Internationale and is currently owned by Dawn Adventist Broadcasting.

References

External links
 

IVE-LP
Radio 74 Internationale radio stations
Hamilton County, Nebraska
2005 establishments in Nebraska
Radio stations established in 2005